The Cimarron River, flowing entirely in New Mexico, was also known as La Flecha or Semarone. Its headwaters are Moreno, Sixmile, and Cieneguilla creeks in the Sangre de Cristo Mountains, which feed into Eagle Nest Dam.

This river flows within a mountainous canyon that is part of Cimarron Canyon State Park in the lower Sangre de Cristo Mountains and runs down into eastern plains of New Mexico. This headwaters region is also home to the Philmont Scout Ranch.

Etymology
Cimarron was first applied to either the river or mountains in northeastern New Mexico and applied to other places in the state. The most common belief is that it was named for the Rocky Mountain bighorn sheep, called carnero cimarrnó in New Mexican Spanish.  In addition, cimarrónes was the name for cattle and wild horses. Another of several theories is that is named for the plant rosa cimarróna, a wild rose plant that grows along the river.

However, in 1719, it was called La Flecha which means "the arrow", and may refer to the pass, Palo Flechado.

Irrigation 
The Cimarron River is primarily used to convey runoff water from the Moreno Valley, to local farmers and ranchers downstream who have water rights from Eagle Nest Lake. There are several diversion points along the river in which water is moved into canals and ditches. The three major irrigation districts are Springer Ditch Company, Antelope valley irrigation district, and Vermejo Conservancy
District. Some irrigation water travels 50 miles downstream to locations where it is to be used.

Climate

Recreation and wildlife

State park

Cimarron Canyon State Park, located along the river, offers equestrian and hiking trails, fly-fishing, and camping. Located within the Colin Neblett Wildlife Management Area, it is near Angel Fire, New Mexico on the Enchanted Circle Scenic Byway.

Fishing
The first dozen miles of the Cimarron River (from Eagle Nest Lake to Ute Park, New Mexico) are known for fine trout fishing. Stocked trout include rainbow and brown. The river is maintained by the New Mexico Department of Game and Fish at a trout density of approximately 3,000 fish per mile, although water flow can vary between 2 and 50 cubic feet per second.

Wildlife
The most common wildlife to frequent the region include deer, beavers, mice, squirrels, rabbits, chipmunks, and swallows. Mountain lions, coyotes, and black bears are occasionally spotted as well.

See also
 List of rivers of New Mexico 
 Cimarron, New Mexico
 Palo Flechado Pass
 Taos Mountain Trail

References

Rivers of New Mexico
Philmont Scout Ranch
Rivers of Colfax County, New Mexico
Tributaries of the Arkansas River